The Strategic Management Society (SMS) is a professional society for the advancement of strategic management. The society consists of nearly 3,000 members representing various backgrounds and perspectives from more than eighty different countries. Membership is composed of academics, business practitioners, and consultants. The society has been credited with being a factor in the development of strategic management as a legitimate field of scholarly endeavor. The SMS publishes the Strategic Management Journal, Strategic Entrepreneurship Journal and the Global Strategy Journal.

History
The Strategic Management Society was founded at an initial meeting in London in 1981.  Founding officers were elected at a second conference held in Montreal in 1982, and the founding constitution was drawn and approved at the third meeting in Paris in 1983. There were 459 original founding members of the society.

Former presidents
Russel Coff, 2017-2018
Marjorie Lyles, 2015-2016
Bob Hoskisson, 2013-2014
Jay Barney, 2011-2012
Joan Enric Ricart, 2009-2010
Michael Hitt, 2007–2008
Richard A. Bettis, 2005–2006
Jeremy Davis, 2003–2004
John McGee, 2000–2003
Howard Thomas, 1997–2000
Richard Rumelt, 1994–1997
Carlos Cavallé, 1991–1994
Henry Mintzberg, 1988–1991
Derek Channon, 1985–1988
Dan Schendel, 1982–1985

Publications

Strategic Management Journal

The Strategic Management Journal has, since its establishment in 1980, been the official journal of the Strategic Management Society. It is published in 13 issues per year by Wiley-Blackwell and the editors-in-chief are Richard A. Bettis, Will Mitchell, and Edward J. Zajac. According to the Journal Citation Reports, the journal has a 2012 impact factor of 3.367.

Key topics discussed in the journal are strategic resource allocation; organization structure; leadership; entrepreneurship and organizational purpose; methods and techniques for evaluating and understanding competitive, technological, social, and political environments; planning processes; and strategic decision processes.

Strategic Entrepreneurship Journal

The Strategic Entrepreneurship Journal is a quarterly publication of the Strategic Management Society. It was established in 2007 and is published by Wiley-Blackwell. The editors-in-chief are Jay Barney, Mike Wright, Rajshree Agarwal, and G. T. Lumpkin. According to the Journal Citation Reports, the journal has a 2012 impact factor of 1.205.

The journal covers practice of managing organizations as they deal with entrepreneurial processes and the inevitable changes and transformations that result in ten theme areas:
Entrepreneurship and economic growth
Change
Risk and uncertainty
Innovation
Creativity, imagination and opportunities
Strategy versus entrepreneurship
Technology
Social role of entrepreneurship
Behavioral characteristics of entrepreneurial activity
Entrepreneurial actions, innovation and appropriability

Global Strategy Journal

The Global Strategy Journal] is a quarterly publication of Wiley-Blackwell published on behalf of the Strategic Management Society. The journal was established in May 2011. The first two issues of volume one were released in May 2011 as a double issue. The first volume included two invited papers for each of the ten topic areas:
International and global strategy
Assembling the global enterprise
Strategic management of the global enterprise
Global strategy and inter-organizational networks
Performance and global strategy
Global strategy and the global business environment
Strategy and location
Comparative strategies
Global innovation and knowledge strategies
Global strategy and emerging economies

The SMS Book Series
The SMS Book Series is published in cooperation with Wiley-Blackwell and focuses on cutting edge concepts/topics in strategic management theory and practice. The books emphasize building and maintaining bridges between theory and practice in strategic management. The work published generates and tests theories of strategic management and it demonstrates how to learn, understand and apply these theories in practice.

Meetings

Annual conferences
The SMS holds an annual conference, typically alternating between North America and Europe. Past locations include Prague, Berlin, Vancouver, San Francisco, Paris, Baltimore, San Juan, Orlando, Vienna, San Diego, Cologne, Washington, D.C.

Each conference addresses a current theme, with specific tracks addressing sub-themes, and presents multiple sessions by leading experts in the field from around the world.

Special conferences
Along with the annual conference, each year SMS organizes special conferences that focus on a particular topic or region. Previous special conferences were held in India in 2008 and Finland in 2010. In March 2011, a special conference was held in Rio de Janeiro to discuss the role of Latin America in global development. In June 2011, scholars reflected on the extensive contributions of C.K. Prahalad, in a special conference in San Diego organized after his death in April 2010. The next special conference was in Guangzhou, Guangdong, China in December 2012. The focus of this conference was "Competing and Cooperating in and for China."

Membership
SMS has nearly 3,000 members from more than eighty different countries. Membership is open to anyone who is active in the strategic management field, either as an academic scholar or teacher, as a business practitioner, or in a consulting capacity. There are three distinct memberships.

Emeritus membership is offered to individuals who are passed the age of 65 and have been an SMS member for at least 10 years.  Student membership is offered to individuals who are enrolled full-time, in-residence at the PhD granting institution. Individuals can be SMS student members for up to five years

Fellows
The Strategic Management Fellows are a group of individuals   elected because of their substantial contribution to the field . There are currently 62 fellows.

Strategy Research Foundation
The Strategy Research Foundation (SRF) is an initiative of the Strategic Management Society to support the generation, preservation and dissemination of new knowledge in the field of strategic management. Initially funded by the SMS, the foundation provides support, primarily in the form of research grants, to academic researchers with the aim of promoting their research and inviting them to tackle problems and issues as defined in the annual SRF call for proposals for the General Research Program and the Dissertation Research Program.

See also
Strategic management

References

External links
 
 Strategy Research Foundation

International professional associations
Society